Frances Seymour may refer to:
 Frances Stewart, Duchess of Lennox (1578–1639), wife of Edward Seymour, 1st Earl of Hertford
 Frances Seymour, Duchess of Somerset (1599–1674), wife of William Seymour, 2nd Duke of Somerset
 Frances Darcy, Countess of Holderness (1618−1681), daughter of the above, previously Viscountess Molyneux and Countess of Southampton
 Frances Seymour, Lady Hungerford (bef. 1654–1716), daughter of Charles Seymour, 2nd Baron Seymour of Trowbridge
 Frances Seymour, Duchess of Somerset (1699–1754), wife of Algernon Seymour, 7th Duke of Somerset
 Frances Ford Seymour (1908–1950), Canadian-American socialite, second wife of Henry Fonda and mother of Jane and Peter Fonda

See also
 Francis Seymour (disambiguation)